The Vice Presidential Palace is occupied by the offices of the Vice President of Indonesia, located on Merdeka Selatan Street in Jakarta.  It is currently occupied by Vice President Ma'ruf Amin.

See also

 Bogor Palace
 Gedung Agung
 Merdeka Palace
 State Palace (Indonesia)

Buildings and structures in Jakarta
Official residences in Indonesia